Katmai may refer to:

Katmai National Park and Preserve, a park in Alaska
Mount Katmai, a volcano in the Katmai Park in Alaska; the site of a colossal 1912 eruption
Katmai (microprocessor), a Pentium III computer microprocessor core
, an ammunition ship in the US Navy from 1945 to 1973
Katmai Bay, a United States Coast Guard cutter
Microsoft SQL Server 2008's codename